Ghost Trick: Phantom Detective is an adventure game developed and published by Capcom. Ghost Tricks story centers on the amnesiac ghost of the recently deceased protagonist, Sissel, and his struggle to discover who he was and how he died. The player, assuming the role of Sissel, must perform various "Ghost Tricks" to solve puzzles and navigate the land of the living in spectral form.

The lead development, writing, and directing were handled by Shu Takumi, creator of the Ace Attorney franchise. The game was released for the Nintendo DS in Japan on June 19, 2010; in North America on January 11, 2011; in Europe on January 14, 2011; and in Australia on January 20, 2011. An iOS version was released in Japan on December 16, 2010 and the rest of the world on February 2, 2012. An HD remaster is scheduled for release on Nintendo Switch, PlayStation 4, Windows and Xbox One, on June 30, 2023.

Gameplay

Ghost Trick is an adventure game in which players control Sissel, a ghost who uses his unearthly powers to save lives. During gameplay segments, players can swap at will between the Land of the Living, where time flows naturally, and the Ghost World, in which time is stopped. In the Ghost World, Sissel can travel between objects within a certain radius. These objects are represented by blue cores, and in the Land of the Living, Sissel can animate these objects to perform actions, known as "Ghost Tricks", that open new paths or influence the characters around him. For example, moving a tray of donuts will prompt a character to change where he or she is currently seated, as well as giving Sissel access to new areas.

Much of the plot is driven by Sissel's ability to possess corpses. When he does this, he can return to the time four minutes before the corpse's death. In these four minutes, Sissel can attempt to use his Ghost Tricks to alter the situation, and ultimately change the future by saving the person's life. He can also communicate with the ghost of whomever he is saving, but only if the ghost is conscious. If the player fails to save the victim in time, he may choose to go back to the beginning of the four minutes, or return to a checkpoint created when the player manages to alter fate a little. Later in the game, players can switch control to Missile, the ghost of a small dog. Missile's spirit has a longer reach than Sissel, and has the ability to swap the position of two objects that are of the same shape. The majority of Ghost Trick'''s gameplay segments consist of the puzzles that make up these scenarios.

Plot

The game starts with the player (a spirit named Sissel) coming to consciousness with no memories of his past. He sees a corpse of a man on the ground in a junk-yard, and believes he just recently died. Another spirit named Ray tells Sissel about the nature of spirits, and his special abilities known as "ghost tricks". He demonstrates the ability to inhabit objects and manipulate them. Ray also tells Sissel that he can use ghost tricks to go back four minutes before the death of a person and attempt to save their life. Sissel does so to save the life of Lynne, a young detective, from an assassin. Sissel wishes to recover his memories, He then learns Lynne had come to the junk-yard to get information from him. Being the only lead to his past, Sissel decides to follow her. Ray warns that Sissel's spirit will dissipate at dawn.

As the night progresses, Sissel and Lynne work together to save others as Sissel learns pieces about the past. Ten years prior, Detectives Jowd and Cabanela had arrested Yomiel, a man suspected of being a foreign spy. Yomiel escaped and fled into a nearby park, taking young Lynne hostage. Jowd gave chase and before he could shoot Yomiel, a meteorite struck nearby and fragments from its impact struck and killed Yomiel. Jowd adopted Lynne into his family, including his wife Alma, daughter Kamila, and pet dog Missile. Five years prior to the present, Alma was inadvertently killed by a complex contraption that Kamila had built as a surprise for her birthday. Jowd hid the evidence and took responsibility for Alma's death to protect Kamila, going to prison under Cabanela's watch.
 
In the present, Sissel and Lynne discover that a man named Sith, on behalf of an unnamed foreign country, has been behind the assassination attempt on Lynne, and is blackmailing the Minister of Justice into pushing for Jowd's execution, having claimed to have kidnapped his daughter, unaware that his subordinates mistakenly kidnapped Kamila instead. Sissel uses his ghost powers to help Jowd free himself from prison, though Cabanela recaptures him shortly thereafter. Without Sith's coercion, the Minister stays Jowd's execution, and tells Sissel and Lynne his fear that some spirit known as "the manipulator" is behind many of the recent events, including the death of Alma.

Cabanela is killed while investigating Sissel's body at the junk-yard, but Sissel, with help from Missile, now a spirit with his own ghost tricks, undoes his death. Sissel is surprised to see that the manipulator used his corpse, which had yet to show signs of decomposition, to shoot and kill Cabanela while vowing revenge on Jowd and Lynne. Cabanela reveals that the body Sissel thought was his is that of Yomiel, the true identity of the manipulator, whose body had gone missing shortly after he was pronounced dead; Sissel is confused by this revelation. The body showed traces of the same radiation in the meteorite, which they suspect is preventing it from decomposing.

Sissel, Missile, Lynne and Jowd follow Yomiel to board a submarine belonging to Sith. They find Kamila and corner Yomiel before he can kill Lynne, but Sith then turns on Yomiel, extracting the meteorite fragment still in his body and sinking the submarine after he escapes. Yomiel reveals the meteor fragment is the source of his and the other spirits' ghost tricks, and that he had been working with Sith's organization to bring it to them, taking steps to eliminate all those that knew about it, including Jowd, Lynne, and Cabanela. Yomiel had come to work for Sith as a spirit after finding his fiancée, also named Sissel, had committed suicide following his apparent death, having been promised the means to live a normal life by Sith once he had the fragment.

With apparently no escape and dawn approaching, Sissel realizes that, because Yomiel's corpse died ten years earlier, they can use their ghost tricks to travel four minutes before that point to try to change events. Sissel, Jowd, Yomiel, and Missile all return to that point and are able to prevent Yomiel's death from the meteor fragment while keeping Jowd and Lynne alive. A new timeline is created. During this transition, Sissel comes to discover that he was actually a cat adopted by Yomiel after his fiancée's suicide, whom he gave her name to. Sissel had been in a cat carrier near Yomiel at the junkyard and struck by a bullet and killed. At the end of the night, Sissel finds that Ray is actually an older, alternate-timeline variant of Missile who had tried to go back in time to prevent Yomiel's death without Sissel's help but had failed, and waited ten years to ensure that Sissel would help out to fix events. As a new timeline is written, Sissel has now been adopted by Jowd, Alma, Lynne, and Kamila, while Yomiel happily waits out his prison sentence to rejoin his waiting fiancée. The closing shot of the game reveals that, because of the characters' actions to change the past, it is now Sissel who was struck by the meteorite fragment, living on as a spirit with the fragment in his body.

Development
Development was handled by the creator of the Ace Attorney series, Shu Takumi. "I first thought of this idea about five years ago," Takumi told Famitsu. "We were working on the third Ace Attorney and figured it was time to start thinking about the next thing. So I came up with a plan to make a new type of mystery, something different in style from Ace Attorney."
The game was originally titled as "Ghost Spy", and was later renamed as "Ghost Trick: Phantom Detective". Composer Masakazu Sugimori was inspired by some photos Takumi initially gave him to write the main theme. He also took inspiration from paintings he owned while writing the soundtrack. Following a release on the Nintendo DS in Japan in December 2010, the iOS version was released for the rest of the world on February 2, 2012. The first two chapters are available for free, with additional chapters costing extra.

A remastered version of Ghost Trick is set for release in June 2023 for Nintendo Switch, PlayStation 4, Windows and Xbox One.

Reception
Critical receptionGhost Trick was the best-selling DS game in Japan during its release week at 24,000 copies. It dropped to number nine the following week with an additional 20,000 copies sold, and then to number 22 for its third week. Capcom has listed the game as a contributor to the low sales of its first quarter of its 2010 fiscal year. Results from a poll conducted by Dengeki showed that Japanese gamers found Ghost Trick to be the 13th most interesting game for the first half of 2010.

The game was well received on both platforms according to the review aggregation website Metacritic. In Japan, Famitsu gave the DS version a score of two eights and two nines, for a total of 34 out of 40.1Up.com editor Justin Haywald praised the DS version's puzzles and story. But he pointed out that, "The concept is novel and fun, though you might feel occasionally frustrated by the trial-and-error process to get at a solution." Ultimately, the story's quick "concise plotting and entertaining puzzles" helped elevate the overall experience. Daemon Hatfield of IGN gave the same console version an Editor's Choice award, praising the game's mechanics and animation, although he noted that it "gets a little wordy sometimes." GameSpot praised the unique gameplay and memorable characters. Brian Rowe of GameZone gave it 8.5 out of 10, calling it "a perfect storm of clever puzzles, suspenseful storytelling, and spectacular visuals that hasn't been witnessed since the heyday of LucasArts adventures. The linear plot makes this a one-time experience, but one that is so enthralling and witty that you'll be thankful for the opportunity." Edge gave it a score of eight out of ten, saying, "How apt that interactivity and fiction should finally merge in a fiction about interactions. The dead are restored, and the genre with them." AJ Glasser of GamePro gave it four stars out of five, saying, "The conclusion the plot hurtles toward you may not be one you saw coming (I didn't), but the satisfaction of getting there cancels out all the tufts of hair you ripped out along the way working out the tougher puzzles." Martin Gaston of VideoGamer.com gave both the DS and iOS versions seven out of ten, saying of the former, "It's an elegantly crafted thriller that stands out as an original, charming and beautiful adventure," and calling the latter "an elegantly crafted thriller that stands out as an original, charming and beautiful adventure. As an experience it's well worth the price of admission, but sadly Ghost Trick lets itself down with its overall simplicity and the disappointment of its crucial final act."411Mania gave the DS version 8.9 out of 10 and called it "a must have for your DS library. The game will provide you with 18 chapters and eight to ten hours of high quality entertainment and a gripping storyline. The deeper you dive into the game, the more compelling the mystery unfurls, and the more you’ll want to stay up late into the night finishing this addicting game." The A.V. Club gave it a B+ and said that it was "just one indication that the DS, in its twilight years, is also in its prime." The Escapist gave it four stars out of five and called it "a clever concoction that will stretch your brain in pleasantly unusual ways. It strikes just the right balance between whimsy and challenge, always just the right amount of difficult and bizarre." The Daily Telegraph gave it a similar score of eight out of ten, stating that "The puzzling, while fearsomely inventive and effortlessly pleasurable, unfortunately doesn't fulfil its obvious potential. But if you are possessed by Ghost Tricks charms, you will find an affecting, charismatic game with a whole lot of spirit."  However, Wired gave it seven stars out of ten, stating that "Part of the appeal of the Ace Attorney series is the 'Eureka!' moment, that feeling of brain satisfaction that can only come out of solving a particularly grueling puzzle using nothing but your wits. Ghost Trick has no eurekas, only 'Oh... is that it?'"

Awards
The game was nominated for Best DS Game of E3 2010 by GameTrailers, though it lost to another Capcom game, Ōkamiden. GameSpot gave Ghost Trick the award for "Best Handheld Game" while also nominating it for the "Best Puzzle Game" and "Game of the Year" categories. The game also won the award for "Best Nintendo DS Game" of 2011 from GameTrailers. Ghost Trick was also nominated for an Annie Award in the "Best Animated Video Game" category, alongside another adventure game Catherine. GamesRadar+ included Ghost Trick in its list of the top 50 Nintendo DS games of all time. GameTrailers nominated Ghost Trick for the "Best Story" award. GameZone gave it the "Nintendo DS Game of the Year" award.

In 2011, Adventure Gamers named Ghost Trick the 41st-best adventure game ever released.

Future
In an interview with Official Nintendo Magazine in 2013, Takumi said that he'd love to make a crossover video game between Ghost Trick and his other series, Ace Attorney'', speculating that Phoenix Wright could be killed, while his killer would be prosecuted by Sissel.

Notes

References

External links
 
 Official website  
 Ghost Trick entry at Capcom-Unity

 
2010 video games
Adventure games
Capcom franchises
Capcom games
Detective video games
IOS games
Nintendo DS games
Nintendo Switch games
PlayStation 4 games
Single-player video games
Video games about dogs
Video games about ghosts
Video games about spirit possession
Video games about time travel
Video games developed in Japan
Video games directed by Shu Takumi
Windows games
Xbox One games